The Dothan Subdivision is a railroad line owned and operated by CSX Transportation in the U.S. states of Georgia and Alabama.

History 

What is now the Dothan Subdivision was built in two parts by two different railroads over a period of approximately 23 years. The oldest portion of the line is from Thomasville to Bainbridge, Georgia. The Atlantic and Gulf Railroad completed their line into Thomasville shortly before the outbreak of the Civil War in 1861 interrupted further construction. An extension to Bainbridge was not completed until 1867. Henry B. Plant acquired the Atlantic and Gulf in November 1879 and reorganized the railroad as the Savannah, Florida, and Western the following month.

In March 1887 the Alabama Midland Railway was chartered in Alabama and Georgia in October to construct a line connecting Montgomery and Bainbridge.

After the completion of the Alabama Midland railroad it was acquired in July 1890 by Henry B. Plant of the Plant System and merged with the Savannah, Florida, and Western. Together the railroads formed a continuous mainline from Savannah to Montgomery, colloquially known as the "bow line" due to its distinctive shape.

The Atlantic Coast Line gained control of the Plant System on July 1, 1902. Ownership would remain with the ACL until its 1967 merger with Seaboard Air Line to form the Seaboard Coast Line. The Seaboard System, and later CSX continued to operate the line as the mergers of the 1980s took place.

Numerous through freight trains and local freights were operated under the Seaboard Coast Line and later the Seaboard System. The Dothan Subdivision was a frequent alternative route for trains regularly scheduled for busier lines to the south and northeast, mainly for the Manchester Subdivision. This practice continued well into the CSX era.

Passenger Service 

From the beginning local passenger rail service was provided for the line in the form of local services between towns. A named train, the South Wind originated on the Louisville and Nashville and traversed the route bound for Florida. Additionally, the Seaboard Coast Line railroad operated a pair of local passenger trains in both directions on the line, regularly meeting near Dothan. These local trains were discontinued in May 1971 with the creation of Amtrak.

Amtrak 

With the arrival of Amtrak as the new national passenger service company numerous changes came to passenger service on the Dothan Subdivision. In addition to the cancellation of local passenger trains, the South Wind experienced a schedule change and was renamed the Floridian on November 14, 1971. On October 9, 1979, the Floridian was canceled, ending passenger service over the Dothan Subdivision permanently.

1980s 

In 1983 the Seaboard System was formed to consolidate the railroads of the Family Lines collective into a single entity. Later, in 1986 the Seaboard System merged with the Chessie System to form CSX Transportation. Around the same time CSX sought to eliminate redundancies within their network, and the Dothan Subdivision came into consideration for abandonment. CSX retained the line, satisfied after the abandonment of the Americus Subdivision, which largely paralleled the bow line route less than 100 miles to the north.

Additionally in the 80s CSX sold a pair of lines branching off the Dothan Subdivision at Grimes and Newton, Alabama, to shortline operators.

Present Day 

Perhaps the biggest boon to the Dothan Subdivision came in 2005 as Hyundai completed the construction of a new automotive assembly plant near Montgomery. This plant generates significant traffic for the line. The railroad also provides an important relief route for the frequently congested Manchester Subdivision, a purpose the line has also served for CSX's predecessors.

A number of shortlines also interchange with CSX between Montgomery and Thomasville, including the Conecuh Valley Railroad at Troy, the Wiregrass Central Railroad near Newton, the Bay Line at Grimes and Dothan, the Chattahoochee Industrial Railroad at Saffold, Georgia, and the Georgia Southwestern Railroad at Bainbridge.

In the opening months of 2016, a restricted top speed limit of 25mph, down from 40mph, was established over the entirety of the Dothan subdivision and an infrastructure rehabilitation project set to start on the line was cancelled. Through freight trains were either relocated to other routes or cancelled. However, numerous unit trains originating or terminating on the Dothan Subdivision continued to operate, including loaded and empty unit grain to and from the feed mills located in Troy, Banks, Pinckard, and Enterprise (via Waterford). Lengthy local road freight trains operate the Dothan-Montgomery portion, and occasional unit train shipments of rock and pipe continue to originate in Dothan. On May 22, 2019 CSX announced that more trains (including through freight trains) will travel the line and the speed limit will go back to 40mph on June 1, 2019 since track and signal improvements have been made between Waycross, Georgia and Montgomery, Alabama.

See also
 List of CSX Transportation lines

References 

CSX Transportation lines
Rail infrastructure in Alabama
Rail infrastructure in Georgia (U.S. state)